Tan Holdings Corporation is a holdings company with operations on Guam, USA, in the Commonwealth of the Northern Mariana Islands (CNMI), which is also a territory of the United States, in the Federated States of Micronesia, Palau, and more recently, in Papua New Guinea. It is known for its abuse of Chinese laborers on Saipan resulting with Levi's severing all ties with the company once the conditions of the workers came to light.

History
Established in Saipan in 1991, Tan Holdings Corporation serves as the umbrella organization to businesses established as early as 1972 in Guam by the Tan family, led by its patriarch, Tan Siu Lin, who sits as chairman of the board.

From its first company in 1972 which distributed films to local cinemas, Dr. Tan Siu Lin with the support of his wife Lam Pek Kim and their children, built their business to include real estate and shipping. Today, the family-run business has evolved to include cargo airlines, commercial fishing, ground handling service, hotels, information technology, financial services, logistics services, publishing, retail and wholesale distribution, amusement, and fast food.

Jerry Tan, third son to Dr. Tan Siu Lin and Lam Pek Kim, and who is based in Saipan, serves as the company's COO and President. He has, for the past decade or so, been heading the company's activities and thrusts across the western pacific. The company's Executive Vice-President is George Chiu, who is based in Guam.

In the 1980s–1990s, at the height of the garment industry in Saipan, the Tan family's garment operations were one of the largest on-island. However, in 2005 when the garment quota on China was lifted, factories in Saipan began to shift operations back to China, where labor was much cheaper. Saipan saw the last of its factories close down in 2008.

In 1992, Cited for sub-minimum wages, seven-day work weeks with 12-hour shifts, poor living conditions and other indignities, Tan Holdings Corporation, Levi Strauss' Marianas subcontractor, paid what were then the largest fines in U.S. labor history, distributing more than $9 million in restitution to some 1,200 employees. 

In 2002, Tan Holdings Corporation established the Tan Holdings Foundation, an organization whose sole existence was to promote and support the philanthropic efforts and aspirations of Dr. Tan Siu Lin and his family.

In 2003, Jerry Tan was awarded Business Person of the Year by the Saipan Chamber of Commerce, and in 2004,  as Employer of the Year by the CNMI Society of Human Resource Management (SHRM).

With the loss of garment manufacturing as a key industry, Tan Holdings shifted its focus to tourism, heavily investing in the industry and promoting the islands to China, Korea and Russia, as well as to the CNMI's traditional market, Japan.

In 2009, Jerry Tan was awarded the 2009 Executive of the Year by Guam Business News. The award is given to outstanding businessmen in recognition of their success and significant contributions to the Guam community through civic and humanitarian activities.

See also
 Jack Abramoff CNMI scandal

References

External links
 Official website

Holding companies of the United States
Saipan
Levi Strauss & Co.